Ty Olsson (born January 28, 1974) is a Canadian actor. He is known for playing Benny Lafitte in Supernatural, real-life 9/11 victim Mark Bingham in the A&E television film Flight 93, and Ord in the PBS Kids animated children's series Dragon Tales.

Early life
Olsson was born in Halifax, Nova Scotia, Canada. He was raised in Ottawa, Ontario. He attended Canterbury High School, an arts school in Ottawa where he specialized in drama, dance, and music. He continued to study acting at Studio 58.

Career
Olsson has primarily appeared in supporting or character roles in a number of films and television shows. As a voice actor, he is best known as the voice of Herry in the hit Canadian television series Class of the Titans and Ian's older brother Kyle in the YTV animated series Being Ian. He has also been featured in Battlestar Galactica, in Christmas Caper alongside Shannen Doherty in 2007, and as Rollie Crane in Defying Gravity. Olsson starred as 9/11 victim Mark Bingham in the A&E television film Flight 93. Ty originated the role of Deputy Andy on Eureka, but was replaced by Kavan Smith after two appearances. One of Olsson's most notable roles is Benny, a vampire, on Season 8 of Supernatural.

Personal life
Olsson was married to Leanna Nash until their divorce in 2012. They share two daughters, Daygan and MacKenzie. On September 7th, 2019, Olsson married Katherine Lohmeyer, a NICU nurse in Las Vegas, Nevada. He filed for divorce on September 9, 2021 after a domestic dispute that occurred on August 7, 2021.

Filmography

Film

Television

Video games

Awards and nominations

References

External links

1974 births
Living people
Canadian people of Swedish descent
Canadian male film actors
Canadian male television actors
Canadian male voice actors
Canadian male video game actors
Male actors from Halifax, Nova Scotia
Male motion capture actors
Studio 58 people